William Cheung or Cheung Cheuk-hing (張卓慶, pinyin: Zhāng Zhuóqìng) (born October 10, 1940) is a Hong Kong Wing Chun kung fu practitioner and currently the Grandmaster of his lineage of Wing Chun, entitled Traditional Wing Chun (TWC).  He also heads the sanctioning body of TWC, the Global Traditional Wing Chun Kung Fu Association (GTWCKFA).  He is the recipient of a Masters Award for lifetime achievement in Kung Fu from Martial Arts Australia. 

Cheung is responsible for introducing Bruce Lee to his master Ip Man when they were teenagers in Hong Kong.

Biography
In the 1950s, Cheung grew up in Kowloon, where fighting skills were considered a measure of self-worth and pride. At age 11, Cheung's challenge matches were on the school playground, and his fighting style was Tai Chi Chuan, which was not sufficient to elevate him among the youth of Hong Kong. This fighting was a concern and was frowned upon by his father, who was a police inspector; hence, Cheung avoided becoming involved in gangs. By his teenage years however the challenge fights continued, and—as they are inextricably linked to extortion rackets of secret societies—Cheung's high-achieving family saw him as a source of embarrassment.

Circa 1954 was a turning point in Cheung's life was when a gang leader who was undefeated in combat challenged an old man who was rumored to fight in a little–known Kung Fu style of a woman. Cheung witnessed the challenge and watched as the thin old man who was Ip Man quickly defeated the gang leader. Impressed by the old man's skill, Cheung visited Ip Man and became his student. Over the next few months Cheung became a live–in student for 3 years, before leaving Hong Kong.

Friendship with Bruce Lee

During his time living with Ip Man, Cheung introduced a then 15-year–old famous child actor, Bruce Lee, whom he first met at Lee's 9th birthday to Ip Man. Originally Ip Man had rejected Bruce the right to learn Wing Chun Kung Fu under him because of the long standing rule in the Chinese Martial Arts world to not teach foreigners. His one quarter German background from his mother's side would be an initial obstacle towards his Wing Chun training. However Cheung would speak on his behalf and Lee was accepted into the school.

Cheung and Lee became friends and training partners. After several months of daily training, they both became more involved in street challenge fights, until one day Cheung fought a triad leader and seriously wounded him. This prompted Cheung's father to send him away from Hong Kong to put him out of harm's way; however, the problems followed him, and he and his family decided that it was better for his safety to migrate to Australia to begin a new life.

Later life
Cheung left Hong Kong to move to Canberra in Australia to study economics at the Australian National University. In 1965, Cheung founded the first wingchun kungfu club at his university. After graduating in 1969 with a bachelor's degree in economics, Cheung fully immersed himself in Wingchun theory and practice with a group of dedicated students.

In 1973 he founded a martial arts school in Melbourne, Australia and in 1976 he was elected president of the Australian Kung Fu Federation. Since 1979, William Cheung and some of his students have directed programs for special groups of the US military and other countries.

In September 1986, William Cheung was attacked by a 24-year old Emin Boztepe, a Wing Chun practitioner from VTAA, while holding a seminar in Cologne, West Germany. William Cheung was knocked down in front of numerous students, this episode was filmed on video, and subsequently used by representatives of other lines of Wing Chun for propaganda purposes.

Accomplishments

Teaching traditional Wing Chun

After moving to Melbourne, Australia to teach Traditional Wing Chun professionally in 1973, Cheung established his Wing Chun studio in Melbourne's CBD.  According to The Sydney Morning Herald, his studio attracts hundreds of new students each year. Early in 1976 Cheung participated in the formation of the Australian National Kung Fu Federation and became its president. The federation ran the Australasian Kung Fu Championships from circa 1977/1978. These were the earliest Australian full contact tournaments open to all styles of martial arts.

Cheung trained students in the US as well, including some who became successful in their martial arts careers, such as Eric Oram who went on to train Robert Downey Jr. and Christian Bale in preparation for their Hollywood movie roles.

He also trained Anthony Arnett who has been winning martial arts tournaments since 1974 and has won grand champion multiple times some of which were for 3 years and 6 years running in different tournament circuits.

Cheung taught unarmed combat to the U.S. marines of the Seventh Fleet based in Yokosuka, Japan.

Martial arts
Cheung was acknowledged as one of Yip Man’s disciples who helped to firmly establish Wing Chun’s reputation as a fighting art through the challenge matches in Hong Kong.

In 1984 Cheung set a world speed punching record of 8.3 punches per second at Harvard University in Boston.

Awards
Black Belt Hall of Fame Award - Kung Fu Artist of the year 1983
Inside Kung Fu Hall of Fame Award – Instructor of the year 1989

Magazine front covers
Over a 28-year period Cheung has been featured on the front cover of 35 magazines between 1982 and 2010, the first being Inside Kung Fu in October 1982 and the most recent Martial Arts Illustrated in April 2010.

Academia
Cheung attained a Bachelor of Economics from the Australian National University, after graduating from secondary school in Hong Kong. Cheung is a certified Doctor of Chinese Medicine under the Chinese Medicine Registration Board of Victoria, and a member of the Australian Chinese Traditional Orthopaedics Association Inc. He has also been invited as a Guest Professor to Foshan Sports University (China), and as a Senior Research Professor of the Bone Research Department to Beijing Chinese Medical University (China).

Bibliography

Cheung, William (1986). Kung Fu: Butterfly Swords. Ohara Publications Inc. pp. 223. 

Cheung, William (1989). My Life with Wing Chun (second edition). pp. 192.
Cheung, William (2007). Wing Chun: Advanced Training and Applications. Black Belt Communications LLC. pp. 175. . .
Cheung, William (2005). City of Dragons: Ah Hing – The Dragon Warrior. Healthworld Enterprises Pty. Ltd. pp. 118. 
Cheung, William (1994). CMT: Cheung's Meridian Therapy. Cheung's Better Life. pp. 388.

Videos
Cheung has produced a number of videos, including; 
The Wing Chun Way 
Tao of Wing Chun 
My Life with Wing Chun 
Wing Chun – Advanced Training and Applications 
City of Dragons  
CMT – Cheung's Meridian Therapy  
PRO-TEKT: A Personal Protection Program

References

Australian National University alumni
Living people
1940 births
Hong Kong emigrants to Australia
Wing Chun practitioners from Hong Kong
Australian Wing Chun practitioners